Hierodula patellifera, common name giant Asian mantis, Asian mantis, Indochina mantis or Harabiro Mantis, is a species of praying mantis belonging to genus Hierodula.

Description
Males are about 45-65 mm long and females around 65-75 mm long.  Individuals can vary from green to brown in color. Although this species is fairly large for mantises in general, it is among the smallest members of the genus Hierodula, of which many species can reach 110-150 mm.

Range
They are found in Malaysia, Hawaii, India, Nepal, San Paolo Solbrito, Italy Java, Korean Peninsula, Philippines, New Guinea, Southern China, Taiwan, Vietnam, West Sumba, Honshu, Shikoku, Kyushu, Okinawa,

Habitat
H. patellifera lives in trees and in grasslands at the edges of forests.

Additional images

See also
List of mantis species and genera

References

P
Mantodea of Asia
Mantodea of Oceania
Insects of China
Insects of Hawaii
Insects of India
Insects of Japan
Insects of Korea
Insects of New Guinea
Insects of Taiwan
Insects of Vietnam
Articles containing video clips